The 2019 Delta State gubernatorial election occurred on March 9, 2019. Incumbent PDP Governor Ifeanyi Arthur Okowa won re-election for a second term, defeating APC's Great Ovedje Ogboru, and several minor party candidates.

Okowa won in 23 LGAs with a total of 80.17% of popular vote, while Ogboru won in the other two of the state's 25 LGAs with a total of 18.71% of popular vote having 709,336 votes less than Okowa.

Ifeanyi Okowa emerged unopposed in the PDP gubernatorial primary as the sole candidate, retaining his deputy, Kingsley Otuaro.

Of the 50 candidates who aspired for the governorship seat, 42 were male, eight were female.

Electoral system
The Governor of Delta State is elected using the plurality voting system.

Primary election

PDP primary
The PDP primary election was held on 30 September 2018. Senator (Dr.) Ifeanyi Okowa, the incumbent governor, who was the party sole aspirant, emerged winner with 3,252 delegate votes. The chairperson of the PDP gubernatorial primary elections in Delta State announced there were 3,278 accredited delegates from across the state's local government areas, who cast 26 invalid votes.

Candidates
Party nominee: Ifeanyi Okowa: Incumbent governor.
Running mate: Kingsley Otuaro.

APC primary
The emergence of Chief Great Ogboru and Prof. Pat Utomi as the All Progressives Congress (APC) 2019 Delta State governorship candidates got messy, as the APC primary elections could not be held in a single venue but ran concurrently in two locations in Asaba. This crisis began early in the month of the elections. The elections returning officer at one venue announced Pat Utomi as the winner with 2,481 votes out of the 3,755 total delegate votes, followed by Rt. Hon. Victor Ochei, Dr. Cairo Ojougbuoh and Chief Great Ogboru, respectively. Great Ovedje Ogboru was, however, declared winner by the returning officer at the second venue, and said to have polled 3,292 votes of 3,515 valid votes; 129 votes were declared invalid. Ochei polled 160 votes, Utomi 26 votes and Ojougbuoh 12 votes. The elections were held on 30 September 2018.

After the elections were concluded, BusinessDay reported one of the candidates, Hon. Victor Ochei, taking the said winner to the Federal High Court in Abuja, asking the court to nullify the results, which were nullified in April 2019.

Candidates
Party nominee: Great Ogboru.
Running mate: .
 Pat Utomi: 1st Runner-up 
 Victor Ochei: 2nd Runner-up
 Cairo Ojougbuoh: 3rd Runner-up

Results
A total of 50 candidates registered with the Independent National Electoral Commission to contest in the election. PDP Governor Ifeanyi Okowa won re-election for a second term, defeating APC's Great Ovedje Ogboru, and several minor party candidates. Okowa polled 925,274 votes representing 80.17% of total vote cast, and Ogboru 215,938 votes representing 18.71%.

The total number of registered voters in the state was 2,831,205 while 1,188,784 voters were accredited. Total number of votes cast was 1,178,335, while total number of valid votes was 1,154,188. Total rejected votes were 24,147.

By local government area
Here are the results of the election from the local government areas of the state for the two major parties. The total valid votes of 1,154,188 represents the 50 political parties that participated in the election. Green represents LGAs won by Okowa. Blue represents LGAs won by Ogboru.

References 

Delta State
Delta State gubernatorial election
Delta State gubernatorial elections
March 2019 events in Nigeria
Gubernatorial